The Anglican Diocese of Wusasa is one of eleven within the Anglican Province of Kaduna, itself one of 14 provinces within the Church of Nigeria. The current bishop is Ali Buba Lamido who is also the Archbishop of the Province.

Notes

Church of Nigeria dioceses
Dioceses of the Province of Kaduna